Nitroacetic acid is the chemical compound with the formula (NO2)CH2CO2H. This substituted carboxylic acid is used as a potential precursor to nitromethane, commonly used as a fuel in drag racing and as an organic reagent in chemical synthesis.

Synthesis
Nitroacetic acid can be synthesized by adding cold chloroacetic acid into a cold, slightly alkaline aqueous solution, followed by mixing with aqueous sodium nitrite solution. It is important during this procedure not to make the solution too alkaline and to keep it cold to prevent the formation of sodium glycolate.

Reactions
Nitroacetic acid can be used in the production of nitromethane by thermal decarboxylation of a corresponding salt to at 80 °C.

References

Acetic acids
Nitro compounds